Kanjanapat Football Club (Thai สโมสรฟุตบอลกาญจนพัฒน์), is a Thai professional football club based in Thanyaburi, Pathum Thani, Thailand. The club is currently playing in the Thai League 3 Western region.

History
In 2006, the club was established in Sisaket under the name of Department of Science Service Football Club.

In 2009, the club was renamed Kanjanapat Football Club and competed in the FS-League until 2018.

In 2019, the club began to compete in the 2019 Thailand Amateur League Western region, using the Stadium of Bangkok University Rangsit Campus as the ground. At the end of the season, they have promoted to the 2020 Thai League 4.

In 2020, the club became a professional football club and competed in the Thai League 4. However, the Football Association of Thailand merged the Thai League 3 and Thai League 4. As a result of this incident, all teams in Thai League 4 were promoted to Thai League 3. The club competed in the Thai League 3 for the 2020–21 season. In late December 2020, the Coronavirus disease 2019 or also known as COVID-19 had spread again in Thailand, the FA Thailand must abruptly end the regional stage of the Thai League 3. The club has finished the eleventh place of the Western region.

In 2021, the 2021–22 season is the second consecutive season in the Thai League 3 of Kanjanapat. They started the season with a 0–0 home drawn to Angthong and they ended the season with a 0–1 away defeated to the Angthong. The club has finished eighth place in the league of the Western region. In addition, in the 2021–22 Thai FA Cup Kanjanapat was defeated 1–6 by Muang Loei United in the qualification round, causing them to be eliminated. In the 2021–22 Thai League Cup Kanjanapat was defeated 0–1 by Phitsanulok in the qualification play-off round, causing them to be eliminated too.

In 2022, the 2022–23 season is the third consecutive season in the Thai League 3 of Kanjanapat.

Stadium and locations

Season by season record

P = Played
W = Games won
D = Games drawn
L = Games lost
F = Goals for
A = Goals against
Pts = Points
Pos = Final position

QR1 = First Qualifying Round
QR2 = Second Qualifying Round
R1 = Round 1
R2 = Round 2
R3 = Round 3
R4 = Round 4

R5 = Round 5
R6 = Round 6
QF = Quarter-finals
SF = Semi-finals
RU = Runners-up
W = Winners

Players

Current squad

References

External links
 Thai League official website

Association football clubs established in 2009
Football clubs in Thailand
Pathum Thani province
2009 establishments in Thailand